David Town (born 9 December 1976) is an English professional footballer. He currently plays for non league side Wimborne Town.

Town began his career as a trainee with his hometown side AFC Bournemouth, turning professional in April 1995. He spent September 1997 on loan to Dorchester Town. Despite not being a regular in the Bournemouth side, Rushden & Diamonds paid £30,000 to take him to Nene Park in May 1999. He joined Hayes on a two-month loan deal in late January 2001, moving to Boston United towards the end of March 2001.

He joined Kettering Town on loan in August 2002 and was released by Boston at the end of that season. In May 2003 he joined Havant & Waterlooville.

He moved to Eastleigh for the 2005–06 season, but left in September 2006 to join Dorchester Town

References

External links

1976 births
Living people
Footballers from Bournemouth
English footballers
Association football forwards
AFC Bournemouth players
Dorchester Town F.C. players
Rushden & Diamonds F.C. players
Hayes F.C. players
Boston United F.C. players
Kettering Town F.C. players
Havant & Waterlooville F.C. players
Wimborne Town F.C. players
Eastleigh F.C. players
English Football League players
National League (English football) players